Unish is a constructed language developed by a research team at Sejong University, South Korea. The term “Unish” is used in reference to it being cast as a universal language in the globalized era.

The vocabulary of Unish is chosen from among 15 languages: Esperanto and 14 major languages that have 70 million or more native speakers or which were international languages in the past.  Decisions are based on the three principles of commonality, short-word length, and simplicity. Consequently, the core vocabulary of Unish is integrated with the simplest words of existing major languages. To date, Unish has a vocabulary of approximately 10,000 words. Sejong University has also offered Unish classes for several years.

Linguistic properties

Classification 
Unish is a constructed language and not genealogically related to any particular ethnic language. The phonological and grammatical structures are based on those of pidgins.

Typologically, in Unish, prepositions and adjectives are placed before the nouns they modify. The word order of a sentence is “subject-verb-object/complement.” This word order is always kept, regardless of a declarative sentence or an interrogative sentence. New terms are formed through the careful selection of words among the aforementioned fifteen languages by seven principles such as: commonality, short word-length, diversity, distinctiveness, simplicity, cultural priority, and compounding.

Writing system 
The Unish alphabet consists exactly of the twenty-six letters of the ISO basic Latin alphabet, which are as follows:

It uses three digraphs: ⟨sh⟩, ⟨ch⟩, ⟨ng⟩

Phonology 
Unish has twenty-two pulmonic consonants, five vowels, and two semi-vowels. Unish also accepts commonly-used vowels and consonants that tend to be easier to pronounce.

Vowels 
The vowel structure of Unish consists of five vowels that are most commonly used in pidgins as well as in natural languages: [i, e, a, o, u].

Semi-vowels 
In addition to the five vowels, Unish also accepts the semi-vowels [j] and [w] in making more elaborate sounds.

Consonants 
Unish accepts consonants that are easy to pronounce and common to natural languages. For example, the dental sounds of [θ] and [ð] are not generally easy to acquire and pronounce. Hence, these sounds are not included in the consonant system of Unish. Moreover, the correspondence between sounds and spellings are as straightforward as possible, as listed below. The aim is such that anyone with a basic knowledge of the Latin script will find the relations between consonants and letters quite accessible.

List

Grammar 

The grammar of Unish was constructed on the basis of the principles of simplicity, logicality, and regularity. For example, irrespective of number (plural or singular) or person (first-person, second-person, or third-person) of a subject, the form of the verb corresponding to the subject does not vary.  Nouns have only one marked case, the genitive, which is identical to the plural, following the principles of simplicity and logicality.

Interrogative Sentence

Unish sentences consist of a subject (S), a verb (V), and an object (O)—ordered (S-V-O). This word order is preserved in declarative sentences (DS) as well as in interrogative sentences (IS). In Unish, the difference between a declarative sentence and an interrogative sentence is that the former ends with a period and falling intonation, while the latter ends with a question mark and rising intonation.

As a result of this rule, interrogative pronouns (who, what, when, where, why, and how) appear in situ, as opposed to always being placed initially within a sentence.

Passive Sentence

In Unish, the passive voice, which tells the story with the object's voice, presents the verb in the form of ‘be + [verb]ed’. To present the person or object performing the action, ‘by + person or object performing the action’ is used in the objective form after the verb or at the end of the sentence.

Personal Pronoun

In Unish, there is no gender distinction in pronouns., and the plural form of a pronoun is created by attaching an “-s” to its singular form.

A plural personal pronoun is obtained by attaching the suffix “–s” to a singular pronoun. The plural forms of all nouns are made simply by attaching that suffix to their singular forms.

Vocabulary 

The Research Team at Sejong University claims that, as the number of developed lexical items has exceeded 9,600, the lexical inventory of Unish provides a sufficient base for everyday conversation. New words are also under constant development for utilization within the context of various speaking and writing topics.

Unish vocabulary is derived from fifteen languages: English, Spanish, Portuguese, Italian, French, German, Russian, Korean, Chinese, Japanese, Arabic, Hindi, Greek, Latin and Esperanto. Words are selected from among multiple terms borrowed from these languages, in accordance with seven criteria: commonality, short word-length, diversity, distinctiveness, simplicity, cultural priority, compounding.

Sample Text 

The following short story—with an accompanying Unish translation—is extracted from Aesop's Fables.

English

The Geese and the Cranes.
Some geese and cranes were feeding together in the same field, when a bird-catcher suddenly came to them. Since the cranes were slim and light, they could fly right off and escape the bird-catcher’s nets. The geese, however, weighed down by their fat, could not take off so easily and were all captured.

Unish Translation

Guss e krans.

Further reading

 Young-Hee Jung. (2004) English, Unish, and an Ideal International Language: From a Perspective of Speech Sound and Writing System. 
 Purev Jaimai & Hyun Seok Park. (2003) Representing Unish Grammars Based on Tree Adjoining Grammar Formalisms. 
 Stuart Read. (2001) Like WTO, Why not WCO? 
 Young-Hee Jung. (2004) Borrowing for a Universal Language. 
 Andrew Large. (1996) The Prospects for an International Language.
 Kwak, E. 2003. Comparison between Pidgins and ‘Unish’. Journal of Universal Language 4, 17-31.

External links
 Unish official site 
 Unish Dictionary Search
 Unish Vocabulary Recommendation

References

Constructed languages introduced in the 1990s
International auxiliary languages
1996 establishments in South Korea
Sejong University
Constructed languages